The 1982 Fiesta Bowl was the eleventh edition of the college football bowl game, played at Sun Devil Stadium in Tempe, Arizona on Friday, January 1. Part of the 1981–82 bowl game season, it matched the seventh-ranked independent Penn State Nittany Lions and the #8 USC Trojans of the Pacific-10 Conference. A slight underdog, Penn State won, 26–10.

This was the first Fiesta Bowl played in January, in light of the bowl game's increasing popularity due to the sunny climate which had games with a team ranked in the top ten appearing in the eight of the first ten editions.  It was the second Fiesta Bowl with both teams in the top ten; the first was six years earlier, and the third was in 1986.

Teams

This was Penn State's second straight Fiesta Bowl and USC's first.

Penn State

The Nittany Lions had spent a week ranked #1 before a loss to Miami knocked them to #6 and a loss to Alabama ultimately dropped them out of championship contention, though they finished the season on a two-game winning streak and ranked in the top 10 for the second straight year.

USC

The Trojans were third in the Pacific-10 Conference after losses to Arizona (which knocked them out of being ranked #1) and Washington (which not only knocked them out of being ranked #3 but also cost them the Pac-10 title) relegated them to this game. One notable highlight was Marcus Allen, who after winning the Heisman Trophy with the first 2,000 yard season, was playing his final collegiate game.

Game summary
The game kicked off shortly after 11:30 a.m. MST, leading off a bowl tripleheader on NBC (Rose, Orange). The Fiesta started a half hour before the Cotton Bowl on CBS; the Sugar Bowl (ABC) moved to a night game this year, opposite the Orange.

USC had more turnovers and punts than Penn State while being outrushed and outyarded by Penn State in a wet soggy game that was at one point 24–7. Halfback Curt Warner scored on a touchdown run early in the first quarter on his first carry of the game. But USC responded when 1981 College Football All-American linebacker Chip Banks returned an interception return 20 yards for a touchdown. Gregg Garrity caught a long touchdown pass from Todd Blackledge 52 yards away to give Penn State the lead they would never again relinquish. Brian Franco added a field goal before the half ended to give Penn State a 17–7 halftime lead.

Warner added his second touchdown run of the day and USC could only respond with a field goal by Steve Jordan. When USC was stopped deep in its own territory later in the quarter, Dave Paffenroth's punt was blocked and went out of the end zone for a safety; the Nittany Lions led 26–10 after three quarters. The fourth quarter was scoreless and Penn State repeated as Fiesta Bowl champions.

Scoring
First quarter
PSU – Curt Warner 17-yard run (Brian Franco kick)
USC – Chip Banks 20-yard interception return (Steve Jordan kick)
Second quarter
PSU – Gregg Garrity 52-yard pass from Todd Blackledge (Franco kick)
PSU – Franco 21-yard field goal 
Third quarter
PSU – Warner 21-yard run (Franco kick)
USC – Jordan 37-yard field goal 
PSU – Safety (Dave Paffenroth punt blocked out of end zone)
Fourth quarter
No scoring

Statistics
{| class=wikitable style="text-align:center"
! Statistics!!Penn State!!USC
|-
| First Downs || 20|| 19
|-
| Yards Rushing|| 51–218|| 41–60
|-
| Yards Passing || 175|| 202
|-
| Passing || 11–24–2|| 16–32–3
|-
| Return Yards || 78||38
|-
| Total Offense || 75–393|| 73–262
|-
|Punts–Average ||4–50.8|| 5–40.2
|-
|Fumbles–Lost ||3–2|| 3–2
|-
|Turnovers|| 4|| 5
|-
|Penalties–Yards ||7–70|| 7–49
|-
|Time of Possession ||29:44||30:16
|}

References

External links
Fiesta Bowl – January 1, 1982

Fiesta Bowl
Fiesta Bowl
Penn State Nittany Lions football bowl games
USC Trojans football bowl games
Fiesta Bowl
January 1982 sports events in the United States